Krishnaswamy Natarajan PVSM, PTM, TM, is a retired Indian Coast Guard officer who served as the 23rd Director General of the Indian Coast Guard. He assumed the office on 1 July 2019 and served until his superannuation on 31 December 2021. He is currently the Executive Director of Regional Cooperation Agreement on Combating Piracy and Armed Robbery against ships in Asia - Information Sharing Centre (ReCAAP, ISC) in Singapore.

Early life and education 
Natarajan was born on 30 Dec 1961 and completed his education in Chennai. He holds a master's degree in Defence & Strategic Studies from Madras University. He is an alumnus of the Defence Services Staff College, Wellington. He has specialized in Search and Rescue as well as Maritime Safety and Port Operations, at the United States Coast Guard Training Center in Yorktown, Virginia.

Career
Natarajan joined the Indian Coast Guard on 18 January 1984 and did his education in Chennai. He holds a master's degree in Defence & Strategic Studies from Madras University. He is an alumnus of the Defence Services Staff College, Wellington. He has specialized in Search and Rescue as well as Maritime Safety and Port Operations, at the US Coast Guard Reserve Training Centre, Yorktown, Virginia.

Natarajan has held various important Command and Staff appointments, both afloat and ashore, with distinction. He has commanded all classes of Indian Coast Guard ships viz Advanced Offshore Patrol Vessel (AOPV) Sangram, Offshore Patrol Vessel (OPV) Veera, Fast Patrol Vessel (FPV) Kanaklata Barua and Inshore Patrol Vessel (IPV) Chandbibi. His important ashore Command appointments include the Commander Coast Guard District No.5 (Tamil Nadu) and the Commanding Officer ICGS Mandapam. His key staff assignments at the Coast Guard Headquarters, New Delhi include Principal Director (Policy & Plans), Chairman Coast Guard Service Selection Board, Principal Director (Projects), Joint Director (Operations), Coast Guard Advisor (CGA) to Director General Indian Coast Guard. Natarajan has held the appointments of Chief Staff Officer (Personnel & Administration) at Headquarters Region (East), Chennai and Chief of Staff at Headquarters Region (West), Mumbai.He has also held the appointment of Officer-in-Charge, Coast Guard Training Centre, Kochi.

Flag rank
On elevation to the Flag rank in Aug 2009, he spearheaded the Staff Division of Policy & Plans at the Coast Guard Headquarters as the Deputy Director General (Policy & Plans) till Apr 2014. He was instrumental in giving a fillip to the overall growth of the Coast Guard, post 26/11, in terms of establishing additional 20 Stations, 10 Air Establishment, Two Regional Headquarters, Two Seaboards and contract for 120 ships & boats and infrastructure development including a dedicated Academy. Natarajan was Commander Coast Guard Region (Andaman & Nicobar) from May 14-Jul-15 and Commander Coast Guard Region (West) from Jul 15-Aug-16. He was elevated to the rank of Additional Director General on 12-Aug-16 and since then held the reins of the Coast Guard Commander (Western Seaboard) till 29-Jun-19.
 
The numerous achievements of the Flag Officer during his distinguished career include those having deep fiscal bearing for the country. As the then Commanding Officer of CG Station at Mandapam in 1991–92, choked channels for smuggling of contrabands to Sri Lanka. In June 2006, his methodical planning as Chief of Staff Headquarters Region (West) resulted in apprehension of 200 kg Cocaine off Mumbai. In July 2017, as the Coast Guard Commander (Western Seaboard), the Apex Level Op Control Authority on the West Coast, orchestrated the landmark operation for intercepting MV Hennry leading to recovery of 1.5 Ton Heroin worth ₹ 5000 Cr. In recognition of his exceptional service, he was awarded “World Customs Organisation (WCO) Certificate of Merit” in 2018.

Natarajan is the second direct entry Coast Guard officer who took over the helm of Indian Coast Guard on 30 Jun 19 as 23rd Director General.

Personal life
The Flag Officer is married to Mrs Jayanthi Natarajan and the couple is blessed with two children.

Awards and decorations
Natarajan is a recipient of Param Vishisht Seva Medal in 2021, President's Tatrakshak Medal (Distinguished Service) in 2011, Tatrakshak Medal (Meritorious) in 1996, Lieutenant Governor (Andaman & Nicobar Islands) Commendation in Jan 15. He was awarded “Kashti Ratna” in Oct 16 and “Samudra Manthan Award” in Dec 2017 for outstanding contribution towards maritime Safety and Security.

Events & Activities
Investiture Ceremony
26 Sep 2019 - Digital commissioning first of its kind in maritime history: Coast Guard DG

Commissioning of Assets
28 Aug 21 : ICGS Vigraha -  Raksha Mantri Shri Rajnath Singh to commission indigenously built Indian Coast Guard Ship Vigraha on Saturday
29 May 21 : ICGS Sajag   -  Indian Coast Guard Offshore Patrol Vessel Sajag commissioned by National Security Advisor Shri Ajit Doval
24 Mar 21 : ICGS Vajra   -  Coast Guard patrol vessel Vajra commissioned, to be based at Tuticorin
19 Feb 21 : ICGS C-453   -  ICG ship C-453 commissioned
15 Dec 20 : ICGS Sujeet  -  Offshore Patrol Vessel 'Sujeet' to be commissioned today
15 Dec 20 : ICGS C-454   -  Coast Guard commissions interceptor boat in Surat
03 Nov 20 : ICGS C-452   -  https://www.indiastrategic.in/commissioning-of-coast-guard-ship-c-452/ 
20 Aug 20 : ICGS C-449   -  Indian Coast Guard commissions new Interceptor boat C-449 for east region
15 May 20 : ICGS Sachet, C-450 & C-451  -  Raksha Mantri Shri Rajnath Singh commissions Indian Coast Guard Ship ‘Sachet’ and two interceptor boats;
28 Feb 20 : ICGS Varad   -  Shri Mansukh Mandaviya commissions Indian Coast Guard’s Offshore Patrol Vessel ICGS Varad;
29 Jan 20 : ICGS C-448   -  ICG commissions interceptor boat C-448 in Mangaluru
25 Sep 19 : ICGS Varaha  -  Rajnath Singh: ICGS 'Varaha' commissioned by Rajnath Singh

References

Directors General of the Indian Coast Guard
Living people
1961 births
Defence Services Staff College alumni